Christos Lisgaras (born 12 February 1986) is a Greek professional footballer who plays as a centre-back for Super League 2 club Makedonikos.

Career

He started his career at the youth teams of Olympiacos. In 2005, he signed for Panachaiki, where he stayed for 4 years. In 2009, he moved to Vyzas Megaron and he joined current club Levadiakos in 2010. He stayed for three years and in the summer of 2013, he signed a year contract with Asteras Tripolis. Since 2014, he played for Xanthi.

References

External links
Insports profile 

1986 births
Living people
Greek footballers
Greece youth international footballers
Super League Greece players
Gamma Ethniki players
Football League (Greece) players
Super League Greece 2 players
Olympiacos F.C. players
Panachaiki F.C. players
Vyzas F.C. players
Levadiakos F.C. players
Asteras Tripolis F.C. players
Xanthi F.C. players
Apollon Smyrnis F.C. players
Makedonikos F.C. players
Association football defenders
Footballers from Ioannina